Ronald Godfrey Tanner FRGS (24 September 1927 – 10 July 2002) was an Australian professor of classics, associated for the greater part of his career with the University of Newcastle. Educated at Melbourne and Cambridge, Tanner was appointed to Newcastle University College (NUC) in 1959 and became renowned at the institution for his enthusiastic involvement in student life and for his eccentric character (he cycled about campus in full academic dress as a matter of course).

Tanner was a key figure in the campaign for NUC's independence from the University of New South Wales.   According to University legend, Tanner officiated at a celebratory bonfire for the inaugural Autonomy Day, during which he poured goon (exploitatively inexpensive cask white wine) libations onto the ground to "sanctify the land upon which the University rests". The Godfrey Tanner Bar in the Shortland Building is named in his honour and provides $4.50 schooners (as of mythic memory) for students on Wednesdays.

References

External links
University Information Page

1927 births
2002 deaths
Australian classical scholars
University of Melbourne alumni
Alumni of Clare College, Cambridge
Fellows of the Royal Geographical Society